Sabudana papar (also spelled sabudana papad) is a crisp flatbread from the Indian subcontinent, being a type of papar. It is commonly served as a street food in India and Pakistan, as well as during festivals.

See also 
List of snack foods from the Indian subcontinent

References 

Appetizers
Indian snack foods
Pakistani fast food
Street food in Pakistan